Cyclophora serveti is a moth in the family Geometridae. It is found in Spain.

References

Moths described in 1999
Cyclophora (moth)
Moths of Europe